Sunshine Studios is an international dance organisation. It was founded by hip-hop teacher Jerry Tse (a.k.a. JV) in Manchester, England, in 2006.

Sunshine Studios gives artists of various performing and visual arts studio space and the chance to run public classes. It uses a similar business model to other dance studios such as Pineapple Studios in London and Steps On Broadway in New York City. The studios offer a variety of workshops and nearly 100 classes per week. These include urban art, live music, hip-hop, ballet, tap, jazz, salsa, pilates, pole-dancing, flamenco, cheerleading, contemporary dance, breakdancing and other forms of performing arts.

History
The idea for a dance studio in Manchester had been developed by Tse since 2002.

There was a fire at its Dale St premises in June 2007, and their second building was the target of an arson attack in August 2007.

Britain's Got Talent winner George Sampson was a member of the studio.

The organisation now also runs studios in Bolton, Blackburn, Stavanger, Beijing, Cairo and Los Angeles.

References

External links
Sunshine Studios Site
Sunshine Dance Camp Site
Sunshine Youtube Page
International Dance Teachers Association

Culture in Manchester
Dance schools in the United Kingdom
Schools in Manchester